Euplectitae is a supertribe of ant-loving beetles in the family Staphylinidae. There are at least 20 genera and 30 described species in Euplectitae.

Genera
These 27 genera belong to the supertribe Euplectitae:

 Actiastes Casey, 1897 i c g b
 Actium Casey, 1886 i c g b
 Bibloplectus Reitter, 1881 i c g b
 Conoplectus Brendel, 1888 i c g b
 Dalmosanus Park, 1952 i c g b
 Dalmosella Casey, 1897 i c g b
 Euboarhexius Grigarick & Schuster, 1966 i c g b
 Euplectus Leach, 1817 i c g b
 Eutyphlus LeConte, 1880 i c g b
 Leptoplectus Casey, 1908 i c g b
 Mayetia Mulsant & Rey, 1875 i c g b
 Melba Casey, 1897 i c g b
 Morius Casey, 1894 i c g b
 Oropodes Casey, 1894 i c g b
 Oropus Casey, 1886 i c g b
 Pseudactium Casey, 1908 i c g b
 Pycnoplectus Casey, 1897 i c g b
 Ramecia Casey, 1894 i c g b
 Rhexidius Casey, 1887 i c g b
 Rhexius LeConte, 1849 i c g b
 Sebaga Raffray, 1891 i c g b
 Thesiastes Casey, 1894 i c g b
 Thesium Casey, 1884 i c g b
 Trichonyx Chaudoir, 1845 i c g b
 Trimiomelba Casey, 1897 i c g b
 Trimioplectus Brendel, 1891 i c g b
 Trimium Aubé, 1833 i c g b

Data sources: i = ITIS, c = Catalogue of Life, g = GBIF, b = Bugguide.net

References

Further reading

External links

 

Supertribes
Pselaphinae